Conary may refer to:
 Conary (package manager), a package management system created by rPath
 Conaire or Conary, an Irish name

See also
Canary (disambiguation)
Connery